Anej Lovrečič (born 10 May 1987) is a Slovenian footballer who plays as a central midfielder for FC Großklein.

Club career
Lovrečič started his career at hometown club Koper. He made his first team debut on 6 August 2005 as a late substitute in a league match with Nafta Lendava. He established himself as a first team player during the 2006–07 season. In 2007, he signed with Italian side Lecce for €1 million. After unsuccessful spell in Italy, he signed with Celje. Lovrečič signed for Olimpija on 8 June 2010. On 4 July 2013, he signed for Vaslui in the Romanian Liga I.

On 19 January 2015, he officialised his one-and-a-half year contract with Serbian top-flight side FK Voždovac.

On 15 July 2016, he returned to NK Celje for his third spell at the club.

Honours

Club
Koper
Slovenian Cup: 2006, 2007

References

External links

Player profile at NZS 

1987 births
Living people
Sportspeople from Koper
Slovenian footballers
Slovenia under-21 international footballers
Association football midfielders
FC Koper players
Slovenian expatriate footballers
Slovenian expatriate sportspeople in Italy
Expatriate footballers in Italy
Serie B players
U.S. Lecce players
NK Celje players
NK Olimpija Ljubljana (2005) players
Slovenian expatriate sportspeople in Romania
Expatriate footballers in Romania
Liga I players
FC Vaslui players
Expatriate footballers in North Macedonia
FK Vardar players
Slovenian PrvaLiga players
Slovenian expatriate sportspeople in Serbia
Expatriate footballers in Serbia
FK Voždovac players
Serbian SuperLiga players
Ayia Napa FC players
Cypriot First Division players
Slovenian expatriate sportspeople in Cyprus
Expatriate footballers in Cyprus
Slovenian expatriate sportspeople in Austria
Expatriate footballers in Austria
Slovenia youth international footballers
FC Chikhura Sachkhere players